Calliergis is a genus of moths of the family Noctuidae. The genus was erected by Jacob Hübner in 1821.

Species
Calliergis draesekei (Draudt, 1950) Yunnan
Calliergis ramosa (Esper, 1786) central and south-eastern Europe
Calliergis ramosula (Staudinger, 1888) south-eastern Siberia, Manchuria, Korea, Japan

References

Cuculliinae